Maulana Syed Abul Hasan Natiq (November 11, 1886 – May 27, 1969) was an Urdu poet and disciple of Daagh Dehlvi. Besides being a poet, he also participated in Indian freedom movement and was also elected as a member of provincial assembly of Central Provinces in 1926. He was a member of Nagpur municipality for more than two decades.

His family, originally from Gulaothi in United Provinces, moved to Nagpur district in the aftermath of mutiny of 1857. He was born on November 11, 1886, at Kamptee. In his childhood, he was sent to Gulaothi town where he had his early education.

He died on May 27, 1969. He was buried at Mominpura graveyard in Nagpur.

References

Urdu-language poets from India
People from Nagpur
1886 births
1969 deaths